Envi or ENVI may refer to: 

 Standing Committee on Environment and Sustainable Development (ENVI) in the Canadian Parliament
 ENVI is an acronym for the European Parliament Committee on the Environment, Public Health and Food Safety
 Envi (automobile), a defunct Chrysler division to develop hybrid and full electric vehicles.
 ENVI (software), a geospatial imagery analysis and processing application

See also
 Envy